Meir Itzhaki is a former Israeli footballer who from 1997 owned Ironi Nir Ramat HaSharon.

References

Living people
Israeli Jews
Israeli footballers
Hapoel Nir Ramat HaSharon F.C. players
Association footballers not categorized by position
Year of birth missing (living people)